Ajilon Jasper Nasiu is from Rennell Islands - the largest of the two Islands of the Rennell Bellona Province. He is a public servant in Solomon Islands who served as the sixth Speaker of the National Parliament of Solomon Islands since 17 December 2014. He served four years, and was replaced by veteran politician, Patterson Oti. 
Before assuming this post, he had been a Member of the Provincial Assembly (MPA), and was elected Provincial Premier for Rennell and Bellona Province.

Ajilon Jasper Nasiu met with president Tsai Ing-wen of Taiwan on January 31, 2018.

References

Solomon Islands politicians
Speakers of the National Parliament of the Solomon Islands